Garrett Charles Stephenson (born January 2, 1972), is a retired Major League Baseball pitcher. He played eight seasons in the majors, from 1996–2003.

Stephenson's father, Rich, pitched briefly in the Pittsburgh Pirates system and the family were observant Mormons. Stephenson played baseball at Linganore High School and later Boonsboro High School in Boonsboro, Maryland and also averaged 24 points per game as a basketball player. His only college scholarship offers for baseball were a half-scholarship offer from BYU and a full ride from Ricks College. He accepted the latter and, after two years at Ricks, he was selected by the Baltimore Orioles in the 18th round of the 1992 Major League Baseball draft.

Stephenson made his Major League debut with the Orioles on July 25, 1996. He was sent from the Orioles to the Phillies six weeks later on September 4 in a transaction that began when Todd Zeile and Pete Incaviglia were acquired by Baltimore on August 29 and included Calvin Maduro also going to Philadelphia on September 3. In May 2000, Stephenson was named National League Pitcher of the Month after winning 5 games and posting a 1.42 earned run average.

Stephenson suffered a sprained medial collateral ligament in Game 3 of the 2000 National League Division Series against the Atlanta Braves. The injury led to him having Tommy John surgery and missing the entire 2001 season.

Although he did not pitch in the series, Stephenson was sued for allegedly punching a San Francisco Giants fan following a game in the 2002 National League Championship Series. Stephenson and teammates conceded that he confronted and shoved the fan but argued that he threw no punches.

After retirement
Garrett Stephenson is now retired to Boise, Idaho, where he coaches a baseball team. He and his wife Stephanie have three sons, Riley, Teagan, and Britten. Riley Stephenson played baseball at the University of Maryland, Baltimore County.

References

External links

1972 births
Living people
Major League Baseball pitchers
St. Louis Cardinals players
Philadelphia Phillies players
Baltimore Orioles players
Bowie Baysox players
Frederick Keys players
Bluefield Orioles players
Albany Polecats players
Scranton/Wilkes-Barre Red Barons players
Peoria Chiefs players
Memphis Redbirds players
Rochester Red Wings players
Arkansas Travelers players
Baseball players from Maryland
Sportspeople from Montgomery County, Maryland
Latter Day Saints from Maryland